The list of shipwrecks in July 1826 includes some ships sunk, foundered, grounded, or otherwise lost during July 1826.

1 July

7 July

8 July

9 July

14 July

16 July

18 July

20 July

21 July

22 July

23 July

24 July

25 July

26 July

31 July

Unknown date

References

1826-07